Cetamolol is a beta adrenergic antagonist, more specifically a β1-adrenergic blocker.

Synthesis

References

Beta blockers